The 1927 Cincinnati Bearcats football team was an American football team that represented the University of Cincinnati as a member of the Buckeye Athletic Association (BAA) and the Ohio Athletic Conference (OAC) during the 1927 college football season. In their first season under head coach George Babcock, the Bearcats compiled a 2–5–2 record.

Schedule

References

Cincinnati
Cincinnati
Cincinnati Bearcats football seasons
Cincinnati Bearcats football